Dominika is the female version of Dominic. Notable people with the name include:

 Dominika Červenková (born 1988), Czech rhythmic gymnast
 Dominika Chorosińska (born 1978), Polish actress
 Dominika Cibulková (born 1989), Slovak tennis player
 Dominika Furmanová (born 1975), Czech journalist and writer
 Dominika Kaňáková (born 1991), Czech tennis player
 Dominika Kavaschová (born 1989), Slovak actress
 Dominika Kopińska (born 1999), Polish footballer 
 Dominika Krois (born 1972), Polish civil servant and diplomat
 Dominika Kulczyk (born 1977), Polish businesswoman
 Dominika Mirgová (born 1991), Slovak singer and actress
 Dominika Paleta (born 1972), Polish-born Mexican actress 
 Dominika Peczynski (born 1971), Swedish singer, model and television host
 Dominika Piątkowska (born 1986), Polish skater
 Dominika Polakowska (born 1982), Polish ice dancer
 Dominika van Santen (born 1983), Venezuelan model and dancer
 Dominika Słowik (born 1988), Polish writer
 Dominika Stará (born 1993), Slovak pop singer
 Dominika Wolski (born 1975), Polish-Canadian actress
 Dominika Berry  (born 2009), Bahamian 

Czech feminine given names
Slovak feminine given names
Polish feminine given names